The Poughkeepsie Journal Building is the main office of that newspaper, in the city of Poughkeepsie, New York, United States. It is located at Civic Center Plaza, the north end of Market Street.

It was built of fieldstone in a Colonial Revival style in 1941. Architects in the Hudson Valley, and particularly Dutchess County, took inspiration from then-President Franklin D. Roosevelt's efforts to revive its use in the region, following the example of the early Dutch settlers of the area, who built many stone houses for themselves. In particular, the building complements the city's main post office nearby. In 1982 it qualified for addition to the National Register of Historic Places, but it was not listed due to an objection by the owner.

References

Buildings and structures in Poughkeepsie, New York
Office buildings completed in 1941
National Register of Historic Places in Poughkeepsie, New York
1940s architecture in the United States
Colonial Revival architecture in New York (state)